Top Girl is the second extended play by Canadian-South Korean singer G.NA. It features the title track of the same name, "Top Girl". The EP was released on August 23, 2011.

Release and promotion 
The music video for the lead single, "Banana", was released on August 21, 2011. The mini-album and music video for "Top Girl" were released on August 23.

G.NA began promoting the mini-album on KBS's Music Bank on August 26, 2011, with a performance of "Top Girl". She was expected to promote the song "Banana" on music shows as a follow-up song to "Top Girl", but it was deemed inappropriate after the board had reviewed.

Track listing

Charts

Single chart

Release history

References

External links 
 "Banana" Teaser Music Video

G.NA albums
Cube Entertainment EPs
2011 EPs
Korean-language EPs